A technical draw is a term used in boxing when a fight has to be stopped because a fighter is unable to continue from an accidental injury (usually cuts) or foul.

Draws occur when the bout goes to the scorecards, and the officials cannot determine a winner. If a winner is determined, the decision is referred to as a technical decision.

Technical draws also occur when a bout has not completed a certain number of rounds (usually four), which makes it not an "official fight." Most states have eliminated the technical draw decision for bouts that do not go a required distance and have replaced it with a no contest, although the United Kingdom still uses the technical draw.

See also

10 Point System

References

Boxing rules and regulations